The dark-breasted spinetail (Synallaxis albigularis) is a species of bird in the family Furnariidae. It is found in Bolivia, Brazil, Colombia, Ecuador, and Peru. Its natural habitats are subtropical or tropical moist shrubland and heavily degraded former forest.

References

dark-breasted spinetail
Birds of the Amazon Basin
Birds of the Ecuadorian Amazon
Birds of the Peruvian Amazon
dark-breasted spinetail
dark-breasted spinetail
Taxonomy articles created by Polbot